Jodie Stuhmcke  (born 21 November 1980) was an Australian female water polo player. She was a member of the Australia women's national water polo team, playing as a centre forward. 

She was a part of the  team at the 2004 Summer Olympics. On club level she played for KFC Queensland Breakers in Australia.

References

External links
 

1980 births
Living people
Australian female water polo players
Water polo players at the 2004 Summer Olympics
Olympic water polo players of Australia
People from Brisbane
21st-century Australian women